Kuokkala is a ward of Jyväskylä, Finland. It contains six districts: Ristonmaa, Kuokkala, Kuokkalanpelto, Ristikivi, Nenäinniemi and Hämeenlahti. As of July 2012, 17,270 people live in Kuokkala.

The Kuokkala ward is separated from the Jyväskylä city centre by the Lake Jyväsjärvi and is joined to Lutakko by the Kuokkala Bridge. Additionally, it is delimited by the National road 9 on the west, lake Päijänne on the east and the south, and the Äijälänsalmi strait between the two lakes.

History 

Kuokkala was consolidated to Jyväskylä on 1 January 1965. Before that it was a part of Jyväskylän maalaiskunta. Planning started in 1973. The construction of residential buildings started in 1981.

A housing fair was held in 1985 in Kuokkala, which received 200.000 visitors.

The Kuokkala bridge was built between 1987 and 1989.

Districts

Kuokkala 

Kuokkala is one of the districts of Jyväskylä, Finland. It's a part of the Kuokkala ward. The district is separated from the Jyväskylä downtown by the Lake Jyväsjärvi and is joined to Lutakko by the Kuokkala Bridge. Kuokkalan keskusta, Ainolanranta, Suuruspää, Asuntomessualue, Kekkola, Tikka, Pohjanlampi, Keskinen are the subareas of Kuokkala. 

Kuokkala has several services such as a school, a health center, a convenience store and a church.

History 
The construction of residential buildings in Kuokkala started in the 1980s. The Kuokkala bridge was built in 1989.

Ristikivi 

Ristikivi is a district of Jyväskylä, Finland. It is located on a peninsula of the Lake Päijänne and is part of the ward of Kuokkala. The buildings of Ristikivi are mostly row houses and single-family houses built in the 1980s. There is a preschool located in the area.

History 
Ristikivi was originally the name of a farm in the area. It was first mentioned in 1816.

Gallery

References

Literature

External links

Website of Kuokkala Inhabitant Association 
Taikalamppu Day Care Centre in Kuokkala
Peukkula Adventure Park

Neighbourhoods of Jyväskylä